A puzzle in economics is a situation where the implication of theory is inconsistent with observed economic data.

An example is the equity premium puzzle, which relates to the fact that over the last two hundred years, the risk premium of stocks over bonds has been around 5.5%, much larger than expected from theory. The equity premium puzzle was first documented by Mehra and Prescot (1985).

List of puzzles
See also :Category:Economic puzzles; Financial economics #Challenges and criticism.

Equity premium puzzle
Home bias in trade puzzle
Equity home bias puzzle
Consumption correlations puzzle
Feldstein-Horioka puzzle
Forward premium anomaly
Real exchange rate puzzles
Retirement-consumption puzzle
Missing trade puzzle, also known as Border puzzle